"Kisses on the Wind" is the third single released from Swedish singer-songwriter Neneh Cherry's debut album, Raw Like Sushi (1989). Like many songs on the album, "Kisses on the Wind" refers to Cherry's schooldays; the song is about a girl who matures before the other girls do, and as a result, she is the first to draw boys' attentions. It peaked within the top 10 in Finland, New Zealand, and Switzerland and just reached the top 20 in the United Kingdom, peaking at number 20. In the United States, it peaked at number eight on the Billboard Hot 100.

"Kisses on the Wind" is one of many songs containing the sample "What we're gonna do right here is go back, way back, back into time" from the intro of the 1972 single "Troglodyte" by the Jimmy Castor Bunch.

Critical reception
Angus Taylor for BBC wrote in an retrospective review, that the "Cuban-tinged" song's autobiographical words "give an intriguing insight into a young girl who wanted to be remembered for more than just her incredible looks." Upon the release, Bill Coleman from Billboard described it as a "Latin- tinged pop narrative complete with Cherry's spunk, humor, and knack for telling it like it really is." A reviewer from Music & Media felt it's a good choice as the follow-up to "Manchild", and "probably the most commercial track" from her debut album. 

David Giles from Music Week complimented it as "precocious", adding that the song isn't as strong as her previous two singles, "but should still follow them into the top 10." He noted that "Kisses on the Wind" "begins with an outburst in Spanish and locks into a naked, sparse groove like a soul number with the bottom removed." Lesley Chow from The Quietus declared it as "a paean to a girl whose breeziness enchants the young neighbourhood boys. Her presence is reflected in the salsa rhythm, Spanish dialogue and the flowing feel of the whole song. The melody keeps billowing upwards (More like a woman, she walks like one) and is thus subtly suggestive of the female shape."

Charts

References

Neneh Cherry songs
1989 singles
1989 songs
Songs about kissing
Songs about teenagers
Songs written by Cameron McVey
Songs written by Neneh Cherry
Virgin Records singles